Graceland is a 2012 Filipino drama film directed and written by Roy Morales. The film premiered at the 2012 Tribeca Film Festival, and was released on April 26, 2013, in the Philippines. It was also screened in the US, earning $20,791 after a month of its release.

Plot 
Marlon Villar (Arnold Reyes), a driver for a politician, whose daughter (Ella Guevara) is accidentally kidnapped, does everything he can to save her, while being enmeshed in a web of crime and corruption.

Cast 
 Arnold Reyes as Marlon Villar
 Menggie Cobarrubias as Mr. Manuel Changho
 Dido de la Paz as Detective Ramos
 Leon Miguel as Visel
 Ella Guevara as Elvie Villar
 Marife Necesito as Mrs. Marcy Chango

References

External links
 

2012 films
2012 crime thriller films
Philippine crime thriller films
Filipino-language films